Syzygium fullagarii, commonly known as the scalybark, is a relatively large tree in the family Myrtaceae. It is found only on Lord Howe Island. The bark is reddish brown, usually flaking to the touch. The base of the tree is often heavily buttressed. Known for many years as Cleistocalyx fullagarii, however, in recent times it has been placed in the large genus Syzygium.

Taxonomy
Ferdinand von Mueller described the scalybark in 1873 as Acicalyptus fullagarii, before it was renamed Cleistocalyx fullagarii in 1937. The species was reclassified in the large genus Syzygium by Lyn Craven in 1998. Mueller named the scalybark after one of the collectors of the original specimen James P. Fullagar, however originally misspelt the name fullageri.

Description
The scalybark is a sizeable tree that reaches  in height with a buttressed trunk and red-brown flaky bark.

Distribution and habitat
The scalybark is found only on Lord Howe Island, where it may be the dominant tree in sheltered forest. It gives its name to (and is a dominant species of) the Scalybark (Syzygium fullagarii) Closed Forest community on the island, which occurs over 126 hectares and lies mostly within protected area. There has been some invasion by weed species. It is a component of the critically endangered Lagunaria Swamp Forest community.

Uses
The scalybark was historically used for timber.

References

fullagarii
Myrtales of Australia
Endemic flora of Lord Howe Island
Trees of Australia
Taxa named by Ferdinand von Mueller
Plants described in 1874